() is one of the administrative districts of the city of Xiamen, People's Republic of China.

Geography
Huli District occupies the northern half of Xiamen Island, with 3 sides facing the narrow ocean straits that separate Xiamen Island from China's mainland. (The southern half of the island, where Xiamen downtown is, forms Siming District). Huli is the heart of Xiamen Special Economic Zone. It was founded as district in November 1987. Huli District administers Jiangtou, Heshan, Jingshan, Huli and Dianqian. Huli District is the centre for commerce, science, education, sports, tourism and culture.

Administrative divisions
Subdistricts:
Jinshan Subdistrict, Huli Subdistrict, Dianqian Subdistrict, Heshan Subdistrict, Xiamen, Jiangtou Subdistrict

Economy
Huli District's GDP in 2002, was 3.561 billion yuan. The total economic value was 7.127 billion yuan. The Per capita net income of the residents was 8250 yuan. By 2002 year end, the total population of Huli District was 127 200. This made up of 44 400 households. The total population of urban residents is 101 900 which consist of 80.11% of total population. By the start of 2006, local residents were up to 440,000 including 320,000 from other places. This equal to 72.73% of entire population.

Infrastructure 

Huli District has very modern and developed infrastructure such as the Xiamen Gaoqi International Airport, Gaoqi Railway Station (formerly Xiamen North Railway Station; not to be confused with the new Xiamen North Railway Station, in Jimei District), municipal road network, regional road network, city communication network and water, electricity, gas and sewage disposal system. The northern coast of Huli District boast a deep water port.

References

External links

Official website of Huli District Government
Guide to Xiamen
https://web.archive.org/web/20160116140501/http://english.xm.gov.cn/ 

Geography of Xiamen
County-level divisions of Fujian
Island counties of China